The Sri Lankan national cricket team toured New Zealand February to March 1997 and played a two-match Test series against the New Zealand national cricket team. New Zealand won the series 2–0. New Zealand were captained by Stephen Fleming and Sri Lanka by Arjuna Ranatunga. In addition, the teams played a three-match series of Limited Overs Internationals (LOI) which was drawn 1–1.

Test series summary

First Test

Second Test

One Day Internationals (ODIs)

The series was drawn 1-1, with one match abandoned.

1st ODI

2nd ODI

3rd ODI

References

External links

1997 in Sri Lankan cricket
1997 in New Zealand cricket
International cricket competitions from 1994–95 to 1997
New Zealand cricket seasons from 1970–71 to 1999–2000
1997